Dyckia dawsonii is a plant species in the genus Dyckia. It is endemic to the State of Goiás in Brazil.

Cultivars
 Dyckia 'Brittle Star'
 Dyckia 'June'

References

dawsonii
Endemic flora of Brazil
Plants described in 1957